Lophostemon suaveolens is a tree species, also known as swamp mahogany, swamp box or swamp turpentine, of the botanical family Myrtaceae.

It grows to a medium-sized tree, native in Australia and New Guinea.

In Australia, botanical sources describe it as naturally occurring from the north coast of NSW through eastern Queensland to Cape York Peninsula, including the Queensland wet tropics where it extends up to 900m above sea level; it grows in swampy ground or alluvial river flats, in open forests, gallery forests, and the margins of rainforests.

References

Myrtaceae
Myrtales of Australia
Flora of Queensland
Flora of New South Wales
Plants described in 1982